Stewart Middle School' is the name of some schools in the US:

 Garland V. Stewart Middle Magnet School in Tampa, Florida
 Stewart Middle School (Tacoma, Washington)
 Stewart Middle School (Norristown, Pennsylvania)
 S. Gordon Stewart Middle School in Augusta County, Virginia.
 Raymond B. Stewart Middle School in Zephyrhills, Florida.